Temnora stevensi is a moth of the family Sphingidae. It is found from forests from Sierra Leone to the southern Congo.

References

Temnora
Moths described in 1903
Moths of Africa
Insects of West Africa
Fauna of the Central African Republic
Fauna of the Republic of the Congo
Fauna of Gabon